Jo Coppens (born 21 December 1990) is a Belgian professional footballer who plays as a goalkeeper for Sint-Truidense.

Career
In May 2007, Coppens came third with Belgium at the European U17 Football Championship. In the summer of 2007, he was part of the Belgian squad at the U17 World Cup in South Korea. Coppens played all three matches. In the beginning of 2008, he came fourth with the Belgian U18 team at the international tournament of Saint Petersburg.

After running through the youth ranks of different Limburg sides, Coppens signed his first professional contract with Cercle Brugge. He started the season as third goalkeeper, behind Bram Verbist and Patrick Lane. When Verbist broke his wrist in the match against AA Gent, Coppens was given his chance for the last two matches of the season. He made his debut in a 2–1 win against Westerlo. In the summer of 2014, he was released and signed with Dutch side MVV Maastricht.

In 2018, while playing for Carl Zeiss Jena, he scored a goal from 80 metres, in a 4–2 win over Werder Bremen.

Coppens returned to Germany and the 3. Liga in January 2021, joining SpVgg Unterhaching on a contract until the end of the season.

In summer of 2021, he moved to MSV Duisburg. After one year, he moved along to Sint-Truidense.

Career statistics

References

External links

1990 births
Living people
People from Heusden-Zolder
Belgian footballers
Belgium youth international footballers
Association football goalkeepers
Cercle Brugge K.S.V. players
MVV Maastricht players
K.S.V. Roeselare players
FC Carl Zeiss Jena players
Lillestrøm SK players
SpVgg Unterhaching players
MSV Duisburg players
Sint-Truidense V.V. players
Belgian Pro League players
Challenger Pro League players
Eerste Divisie players
3. Liga players
Oberliga (football) players
Belgian expatriate footballers
Belgian expatriate sportspeople in Germany
Belgian expatriate sportspeople in Norway
Belgian expatriate sportspeople in the Netherlands
Expatriate footballers in Germany
Expatriate footballers in Norway
Expatriate footballers in the Netherlands
Footballers from Limburg (Belgium)